Ben W. Ansell  (born 1977) is Professor of Comparative Democratic Institutions at Nuffield College, University of Oxford and, with David Samuels, editor of Comparative Political Studies.

Education 
Ansell graduated with a first-class degree in History from the University of Manchester in 1998, followed by an M.A. in Cultural Studies at the same institution in 1999. He left the UK for the University of California, Berkeley, receiving an M.A. in Political Science. He finished his Ph.D. in Government at Harvard University in 2006.

Career 
Ansell's first academic appointment was as an assistant professor at the University of Minnesota. A year after being promoted to associate professor in 2012, he took up his current position as Professor of Comparative Democratic Institutions at the University of Oxford.

In July 2018 Ansell was elected Fellow of the British Academy (FBA).

His book From the Ballot to the Blackboard: The Redistributive Politics of Education (2010) won the William H. Riker prize for best book in political economy.

Selected publications
From the Ballot to the Blackboard: The Redistributive Politics of Education, Cambridge, Cambridge University Press, 2010.

References

External links 
 Personal website

1977 births
Alumni of the University of Manchester
UC Berkeley College of Letters and Science alumni
Harvard Graduate School of Arts and Sciences alumni
University of Minnesota faculty
Fellows of Nuffield College, Oxford
Living people
British political scientists
Fellows of the British Academy